Dragmacidon is a genus of sponges in the family Axinellidae, first described in 1917 by E.F.Hallman
.

List of species 
Dragmacidon agariciforme (Dendy, 1905)
Dragmacidon alvarezae Zea & Pulido, 2016
Dragmacidon australe (Bergquist, 1970)
Dragmacidon clathriforme (Lendenfeld, 1888)
Dragmacidon coccineum (Keller, 1891)
Dragmacidon condylia (Hooper & Lévi, 1993)
Dragmacidon debitusae (Hooper & Lévi, 1993)
Dragmacidon decipiens (Wiedenmayer, 1989)
Dragmacidon durissimum (Dendy, 1905)
Dragmacidon egregium (Ridley, 1881)
Dragmacidon fibrosum (Ridley & Dendy, 1886)
Dragmacidon grayi (Wells, Wells & Gray., 1960)
Dragmacidon incrustans (Whitelegge, 1897)
Dragmacidon kishinense Austin, Ott, Reiswig, Romagosa & McDaniel, 2013
Dragmacidon lunaecharta (Ridley & Dendy, 1886)
Dragmacidon mexicanum (de Laubenfels, 1935)
Dragmacidon mutans (Sarà, 1978)
Dragmacidon ophisclera de Laubenfels, 1935
Dragmacidon oxeon (Dickinson, 1945)
Dragmacidon reticulatum (Ridley & Dendy, 1886)
Dragmacidon sanguineum (Burton, 1933)
Dragmacidon tuberosum Topsent, 1928
Dragmacidon tumidum (Dendy, 1897)

References